Back to the Future: The Musical is a 2020 stage musical with music and lyrics by Alan Silvestri and Glen Ballard and a book by Bob Gale. It is adapted from the original screenplay of the 1985 film of the same name by Robert Zemeckis and Gale. The show features original music, as well as songs originally featured in the film, such as "The Power of Love" and "Johnny B. Goode".

The musical originally was slated to make its world première in London's West End in 2015, the year to which the trilogy's characters traveled in Part II. However, original director Jamie Lloyd left the production in August 2014 citing "creative differences" with Zemeckis, resulting in a delay in the production's release date. The show received its world premiere at Manchester Opera House in February 2020, ahead of an expected West End transfer. The show starred Olly Dobson playing the role of protagonist Marty McFly, originally portrayed by Michael J. Fox. Tony Award winner Roger Bart played Emmett "Doc" Brown, originally portrayed by Christopher Lloyd. The musical will come to Broadway in 2023, with Bart reprising his role. Casey Likes has been cast to play Marty McFly.

The musical has received positive reviews, and received the Laurence Olivier Award for Best New Musical in 2022.

Background
During a question and answer session at a 2004 DeLorean convention, Bob Gale said that he was interested to adapt Back to the Future for Broadway theatre. In February 2012, a musical adaption of the 1985 film Back to the Future began development and had been explored for around eight years prior. Workshops for the musical took place in 2014, in July in London and the following month in Los Angeles, with the intention to open the show in the West End in 2015, in time for the 30th anniversary of the film.

The movie achieved success at the box office, taking over $380 million. It follows Marty McFly, a teenager who is accidentally sent back in time in a DeLorean to 1955. He meets his future parents in high school and accidentally attracts his mother's romantic interest. Marty must repair the damage to history by causing his parents-to-be to fall in love, and with the help of scientist Dr. Emmett "Doc" Brown (Christopher Lloyd), he must find a way to return to 1985. Back to the Future marked the start of a successful franchise, ultimately becoming a trilogy, with the total income for the three films taking over $936 million.

Jamie Lloyd was initially scheduled to direct the show, but withdrew from the project in September 2014, citing creative differences. After the musical opened in 2020, Bob Gale said that those creative differences were over whether the character Biff should sing: "[Lloyd] thought that a villain would be more villainous if he didn't sing. For me, that was the dealbreaker". Lloyd's withdrawal from the production was expected to delay the world premiere until at least 2016, and a new director was sought. The delay in production marked several other departures of the original creative team including Soutra Gilmour withdrawing as scenic designer, Jon Clark as lighting designer, Alan Williams as musical supervisor and Andrew Willis as skating consultant.

While discussing the project, writer Bob Gale said the stage version would "retell our story on stage in a brand new way".

Synopsis

Act One 
In Hill Valley, California, 1985 ("Overture"), Marty McFly visits scientist Dr. Emmett "Doc" Brown's house and finds a pre-recorded message, playing on a large amplifier, telling Marty to meet him in the parking lot of Twin Pines Mall later past midnight. After destroying the amplifier while playing his electric guitar, Marty walks through town and dreams about being a successful rock artist, while a man named Goldie Wilson runs for mayor ("It's Only a Matter of Time").

When Marty's band audition is rejected ("Got No Future"), Marty's girlfriend, Jennifer Parker, comforts him ("Wherever We're Going") but they are interrupted by fundraisers for the restoration of the town's clock tower, which was damaged by lightning in 1955. Marty, with a flyer on the clocktower in hand, heads home to find his father George being bullied by his boss, Biff Tannen. George discourages Marty from chasing big dreams,  
his brother Dave explains his job at a burger restaurant and his mother, Lorraine McFly, discourages his sister, Linda, from dating and talks about how she first met George and kissed him at a school dance as Marty laments his family's state ("Hello, Is Anybody Home?").

At the Twin Pines Mall parking lot, Marty meets Doc who unveils a time machine made from a DeLorean and explains how he built it ("It Works"). However, due to inadequate protection while loading plutonium into the car's reactor, Doc is afflicted by acute radiation poisoning and starts dying. Marty jumps in the car to seek medical help but accidentally hits , sending him back in time to the day Doc conceptualised time travel in 1955. Ditching the car in a barn, Marty wanders to the town square where the citizens of Hill Valley celebrate the town ("Cake"). Marty witnesses his teenage father get bullied by Biff and his gang and tells him to stand up for himself. When he accidentally reveals then-diner employee Goldie will become Mayor of Hill Valley, Goldie is inspired and encourages George to also increase his self-esteem ("Gotta Start Somewhere"). Marty later finds George spying on teenage Lorraine from a tree ("My Myopia"), but is knocked unconscious when George falls. Hours later, Marty wakes up in Lorraine's bedroom. Lorraine falls for Marty who tries to fend off her advances ("Pretty Baby").

Marty finds his way to Doc's house and convinces a younger Doc that he came from 1985 by revealing his knowledge about Doc's Flux Capacitor. Finding the car, Doc worries that Marty will be stuck in 1955 forever. As Marty despairs ("Future Boy"), Doc states that a bolt of lightning could power the time machine and both he and Marty make use of the information on Marty's flyer to use the lightning bolt. Marty reveals he encountered both of his parents when Doc warns him against meeting anyone in history, causing Doc to instruct him to get George to meet Lorraine. At Hill Valley High School the next day, Lorraine tells her friends about the boy she tended to, while Biff and his gang hear rumors about Marty and plot to get rid of him and Marty himself tries to evade both people ("Something About That Boy").

Act Two 
Doc Brown dreams of the social, technological, economic, and political advances of the future ("21st Century"), waking up as Lorraine invites Marty to the school dance to which Marty reluctantly accepts. Marty visits George to boost his self confidence and dance abilities in preparation for the dance ("Put Your Mind to It"), running through the plan for George to win over Lorraine as well.

While planning to use a wire running from the clocktower to send the lightning to the DeLorean, Doc looks to the scientists throughout history, longing to be famous while noting of those who fail to fulfil their goals despite their best efforts ("For the Dreamers"). Meanwhile, Biff and his gang learn of Marty's attendance at the upcoming dance and plot to defeat him ("Teach Him a Lesson"). On the night of the dance, Doc thanks Marty for giving him hope for his future but Marty secretly writes a letter to warn him of his death in 1985, despite being warned of the harm from disclosing future events. Marty also reflects on his only chance to make it back, but dreams of Jennifer back in 1985 for comfort ("Only a Matter of Time (Reprise)").

During the school dance, Lorraine advances on Marty before Biff locks him in a nearby dumpster and harasses Lorraine. Biff overpowers an arriving George, but George knocks him unconscious in one punch. As George escorts a grateful Lorraine to the dance, singer Marvin Berry and his band, on a smoke break, free Marty from the dumpster but Marvin's fingers are accidentally clamped by the closing lid. Knowing music will be needed for George and Lorraine to kiss, Marty volunteers to play guitar instead. The band plays "Earth Angel" as George and Lorraine kiss, saving Marty's existence. On Marvin's request for another song, Marty performs "Johnny B. Goode", but his guitar solo grows out of hand.

Marty leaves the dance to meet Doc who explains that high winds disconnected the upper cables and that he would have to reconnect them despite his fear of heights. Marty gives his letter to Doc who destroys it, worried about the consequences. Doc braves his fear and the storm to connect the wires ("For the Dreamers (reprise)") while Marty drives the DeLorean, inserts the electric hook and accelerates to 88 miles per hour as the lightning strikes and sends him back to 1985. However, upon arrival, the car fails before Marty can keep driving to the hospital to save Doc. As Marty grieves over failing to save Doc, Doc appears, revealing that he pieced the letter back together and wore a better protective suit.

The following morning, Marty discovers his father is now a renowned science fiction author with an annual celebration named after him, his family is more professionally and socially successful and a servile Biff is under George's employ. At the celebration, the McFlys present the town with a check to restore the clock tower. As Marty and his band perform "The Power of Love" and the whole town joins in, Doc suddenly returns in the upgraded DeLorean, insisting Marty comes with him to see the future. Reluctantly, Marty hops in and Doc sets the car's destination date to the exact time and date of the show's current performance. The DeLorean takes off and flies over the audience, and into the future, as the curtain closes ("Finale").

Production history

Manchester (2020) 
The show received its world premiere beginning previews from 20 February, with an opening night on 11 March 2020, five years later than originally planned, at the Manchester Opera House and then a West End transfer. The musical debuted in England, where the film Back to the Future's popularity had been boosted by its television broadcasts on Christmas or Boxing Day for several years starting in 1988. The production was directed by John Rando, choreography by Chris Bailey, set and costume design by Tim Hatley, video design by Finn Ross, lighting by Tim Lutkin and Hugh Vanstone, fight and stunt direction by Maurice Chan and illusions by Chris Fisher. The films' composer, Alan Silvestri was to compose a new score with Glen Ballard, with the addition of original songs from the film, including "The Power of Love" and "Johnny B. Goode". sound design is by Gareth Owen, musical supervision and vocal arrangements by Nick Finlow, and orchestrations by Ethan Popp.

After several days of performances, due to the COVID-19 pandemic the Manchester Opera House posted to its website: "We regret to announce that from this evening (Monday, 16 March 2020) the Manchester Opera House has closed in light of official government advice". All remaining performances of Back to the Future in Manchester were cancelled and the show did not reopen until it transferred to the West End.

West End (2021) 
The show was transferred to the Adelphi Theatre in the West End, where it opened on 13 September 2021. In 2022, the Original Cast Album was released, along with the extension of its run until 23 October. The production received 7 Laurence Olivier Award nominations that year, including Best New Musical which it won, as well as Best Original Score or New Orchestrations. Many of the original cast retired from the production with their last performance on 15 August the same year. As of January 2023, tickets were on sale till 23 July.

Broadway (2023)
The show is scheduled to open on Broadway at the Winter Garden Theatre in Summer 2023.  Roger Bart and Hugh Coles from the original London cast will return in the roles of Dr. Emmett Brown and George McFly, respectively. In March 2023, it was announced that Casey Likes will play the role of Marty McFly on Broadway. Casting for other roles is still to be confirmed. The show is expected to begin previews on June 30, with an opening night scheduled for August 3.

Original cast and characters

Notable West End replacements 
 Marty McFly: Ben Joyce
 George McFly: Oliver Nicolas
 Lorraine Baines-McFly: Amber Davies
 Biff Tannen: Harry Jobson
 Jennifer Parker: Sophie Naglik
 Goldie Wilson / Marvin Berry: Jordan Benjamin
 Principal Strickland: Gary Trainor

Musical numbers 
Denotes not featured in the Original Cast Recording (#)

Denotes song cut from the original production (%)

Act 1
 "It's Only a Matter of Time" - Marty McFly, Goldie Wilson, Ensemble
 "Audition/Got No Future" - Marty
 "Wherever We're Going" - Jennifer Parker, Marty
 "Hello – Is Anybody Home?" - Marty, George McFly, Dave McFly, Linda McFly, and Lorraine McFly
 "It Works" - Dr. Emmett "Doc" Brown, Female Ensemble
 "Cake" - Ensemble (Spokeswoman, Gas Station Attendants, Insulation Man, Farmer, Mayor Red Thomas)
 "Got No Future (Reprise)" - Marty #
 "Good At Being Bad" - Biff Tannen %
 "Gotta Start Somewhere" - Goldie Wilson, Ensemble
 "My Myopia" - George
 "Pretty Baby" - Lorraine and Girls
 "Future Boy" - Marty, Doc, Ensemble
 "Hill Valley High School Fight Song" - Ensemble #
 "Something About That Boy" - Lorraine, Biff Tannen, 3D, Slick, Ensemble

Act 2
 "21st Century" - Doc, Ensemble
 "Something About That Boy (Reprise)" - Lorraine #
 "Put Your Mind to It" - Marty, George, Ensemble
 "For the Dreamers" - Doc
 "Teach Him a Lesson" - Biff, 3D, Slick
 "The Letter/It's Only a Matter of Time (Reprise)" - Marty, Jennifer
 "Deep Divin'" - Marvin Berry, Ensemble %
 "Pretty Baby (Reprise)" - Lorraine, Linda, and Jennifer #
 "Earth Angel" - Marvin, George, Lorraine, Ensemble
 "Johnny B. Goode" - Marty, Ensemble
 "The Clocktower/For the Dreamers (Reprise)" - Doc
 "The Power of Love" - Marty, Jennifer, Goldie Wilson, Company
 "Doc Returns/Finale" - Full Company
 "Back in Time" - Marty, Doc, Company

Cast recording 

The Back to the Future website originally announced on October 21, 2020 ("Back to the Future Day") that a cast recording of the West End production would be released by Sony's Masterworks Broadway imprint in the summer of 2021. The announcement was accompanied by the release of Olly Dobson's rendition of "Back in Time", which was originally featured in the first film and its soundtrack, in addition to the original track "Put Your Mind to It". The cast recording was released on March 11, 2022.

Reception
The Guardian reported that fans of the franchise gave the Manchester tryout positive reviews, with one commenting that it's "a wonderful tribute to the film" and another that "people are going to be talking about this for a long time". The show received a generally positive critical reception upon its West End opening. The production design received widespread praise, and the performances of Bart, Dobson, Coles and Neal were reviewed positively.

Awards and nominations

Original West End production

References

External links
 

Back to the Future (franchise) mass media
Musicals based on films
Science fiction musicals
2020 musicals
Teen musicals
Laurence Olivier Award-winning musicals